Gloom is the third EP by American death metal band Job for a Cowboy. It became available digitally and physically via mail order only on before Doom . The EP was limited to only 2,500 physical copies, which vocalist Jonny Davy explained, "I feel like we're the type of band where so many people simply illegally download our records in the first place. So why not have the die hards have something to get excited about to get their hands on?" This is the first studio recording to feature bassist Nick Schendzielos and guitarist Tony Sannicandro after former members Bobby Thompson and Brent Riggs departed from the band in 2010, therefore all of Thompson's performance on the EP was replaced by Sannicandro's.

Track listing

Personnel 
Jon Rice – drums
Jonny Davy – lead vocals
Al Glassman – guitar
Tony Sannicandro – guitar, backing vocals
Nick Schendzielos – bass guitar

Production
Jason Suecof – production, engineering, mixing
Alan Douches – mastering
Brent E. White – artwork

References

External links 
 Gloom at Metal Blade Records

2011 EPs
Job for a Cowboy albums
Metal Blade Records EPs
Albums produced by Jason Suecof